John Curr (c. 1756 – 27 January 1823) was the manager or viewer of the Duke of Norfolk's collieries in Sheffield, England from 1781 to 1801. During this time he made a number of innovations that contributed significantly to the development of the coal mining industry and railways.

Personal life
Curr was born in County Durham, England in around 1756. He was raised and remained a Catholic throughout his life. He moved to Sheffield some time before 1776. In 1780 he was appointed superintendent of the Duke of Norfolk's Sheffield collieries. He married Hannah Wilson (18 May 1759 – 10 June 1851) in about 1785, and they had eight children, including Joseph Curr, a Catholic priest, and Edward Curr, who was Secretary of the Van Diemen's Land Company from 1824 to 1841. He died in Sheffield on 27 January 1823.

Career
The career of John Curr has been subject to significant dispute, due to inaccurate statements by early authors about him and misinterpretation. Older works (such as (or those quoting them) often give the date of his colliery inventions as 1776. Curr probably came to Sheffield in 1778.  That August, shortly before the expiry of the lease of Sheffield colliery (in Sheffield Park), he wrote a report on it for the Duke of Norfolk. Contrary to statements by his son, he was probably not there in 1774, when there were riots against the colliery lessees, who insisted on selling coal only at a yard in Sheffield. From Michaelmas 1779, he became superintendent of the Duke's Coal Works.

In 1787, John Buddle, senior reported on the transport system introduced by Curr.  He reported Curr's method using L-shaped cast iron plates cost 6¼d per waggon, whereas the old method cost 10½d per waggon, a saving of 3¾d.  He also referred to Mr Curr's method of 'drawing 2 corves abreast up a shaft 8½ to 9-foot diameter by means of steadying conductors'. Curr substituted small four-wheeled carriages for the sledges that had previously been used to transport coal underground, but this meant that underground haulage by boys, rather than ponies. The corf wheels and 'roadplates' came from Binks, Booth, and Hartop's nearby Park Ironworks.

The use of these rails was subsequently promoted by Benjamin Outram and adopted at many other English mines, quarries and ironworks.  In south Wales, railways using his system were known as tramroads (or dramroads).  Today, the term plateway is sometimes applied to them.

Patents

Publications

See also
Edward Micklethwaite Curr, John Curr's grandson

References and notes
References

Sources

Alexander Lock, Catholicism, Identity and Politics in the Age of Enlightenment: The Life and Career of Sir Thomas Gascoigne, 1745–1810 (Woodbridge: Boydell and Brewer, 2016), ch. 5
Alexander Lock, ‘Curr, John (1756–1823)’, Oxford Dictionary of National Biography (Oxford: Oxford University Press, September 2015)

1756 births
1823 deaths
British people in rail transport
British railway pioneers
Engineers from Yorkshire
Businesspeople from Sheffield
People of the Industrial Revolution